Otters Aquatic Sports Club is a waterpolo club from  Żebbuġ, Gozo, Malta. Otters represents Gozo in the Maltese Waterpolo league system.

For sponsorship reasons, the club is currently known as Otters Nivea.

History
The club website states that it is unclear when the club first started, however the first players were registered with the Gozo Aquatic Association on July 28, 1971, and thus this is considered as the founding date. The first players included Anton Refalo, Victor Grech, George Calleja, Carmel Debattista and Frank Masini. Otters has humble beginnings in the Gozitan Waterpolo League, starting from its second division. Eventually all the other teams (Għajnsielem, Sea Urchins, Blue Sharks, Dolphins, Whales, Penguins) became defunct and Otters joined the national league system.

Otters first fielded an Under-18 team within the Maltese Aquatic Sports Association of Malta in 1977 as an experiment. Eventually, in 1980, Otters started to test the Maltese waters again, and by 1982, they grew too strong within Gozo and thus the club decided to join the Maltese league system for good.

Premises
The club runs a restaurant as part of its premises.

Current squad
 Matthew Xerri
 Chris Teuma
 Andrew Magri
 Gabriel Mizzi
 Michael Paris
 Marko Jelača
 Max Borg
 David Dimech
 Luke Hyzler
 Edward Meli
 Joseph Sammut
                                  Dom Zahra
Head Coach:  Erik Valter
Asst. Coach:  Alfred Cachia
Team Physio:  Lóránt Rozsa

References

External links
 Official Website

Gozo
Water polo clubs in Malta
Sports clubs established in 1971
1971 establishments in Malta